Farrow is a  hypercorrected form of Ferror (Farrar), an occupational surname for a blacksmith or an ironworker, an old name of early Medieval English and French origin. The name derives from the Middle English and Old French terms "ferrer, ferreor, ferrur, ferour" (meaning "smith"),  derivatives of "fer" (meaning "iron" in French), from the Latin "ferrum". The development of the surname shows the usual Medieval English change in pronunciation (and thence spelling) from "-er" to "-ar" and "-ow" endings.

Due to varying levels of literacy, and regional dialects the name morphs back and forth from Farrar, Pharo, Farra, Ferrar, Farrer, and Farrow,  the name itself did not change, but the spelling of it depended upon the scrivener.

The surname is found, in England, originally in those areas in which there were deposits of iron and thus an iron producing industry.

Bearers of the surname belong to various haplogroups including E-M2, I-M233, I-M253,J-M172, R-M269, R-YP5578

Notable people 
Alan Farrow (born 1962), American swimming coach
Amariah Farrow (born 1980), professional football player in the Canadian Football League
Bill Farrow (1918–2003), American professional basketball player
Brad Farrow (born 1956), Canadian judoka
Dave Farrow, Guinness World Records holder for memory
David Farrow Maxwell (1900–1985), eightieth president of the American Bar Association
Elizabeth Farrow (1926–2010), All-American Girls Professional Baseball League player
Ernie Farrow (1928–1969), American jazz multi-instrumentalist
George Farrow (1913–1980), English footballer
Graham Farrow (born 1965), English playwright and screenwriter
Jake Farrow (born 1978), television writer and actor
James Farrow (politician) (1827–1892), 19th century politician
Jane Farrow, Canadian author and broadcaster
Jo Farrow, British broadcast meteorologist
John Farrow (baseball) (1853–1914), also known as Jack, American Major League Baseball player
John Farrow (1904–1963), Australian film director
John Farrow (author), pen name of Trevor Ferguson (born 1947), Canadian novelist
Jonathan Farrow (born 1984), English cricketer
Joseph Farrow (c. 1652–1692), English cleric
Kenneth Farrow (1924–2007), English Police officer and recipient of the George Cross
Kenneth Farrow (American football) (born 1993), American football player
Margaret Farrow (1934-2022), American politician from Wisconsin
Mark Farrow, graphic designer
Mia Farrow (born 1945), American actress
Nigel Farrow (born 1963), English cricketer
Prudence Farrow (born 1948), American actress
Ronan Farrow (born 1987), American human rights activist, son of Woody Allen and actress Mia Farrow
Samuel Farrow (1775–1824), American politician from South Carolina
Stuart Farrow, South African politician
Thomas Farrow (1833–1916), Canadian merchant and political figure
Tisa Farrow (born 1951), American actress
William G. Farrow (1918–1942), American pilot on the Doolittle Raid in the Second World War
William L Farrow (1771–1846) American Pioneer-Soldier-Statesman 
William Hastings Farrow (1893–1946), British flying ace in the First World War

See also 
Faro (disambiguation)
Farrar (surname)
Ferrer (surname)

References

English-language surnames